This is a list of notable Italian restaurants, which specialize in the preparation and purveyance of Italian cuisine:

 Amato's 
 Bella Italia 
 Beppi's Restaurant 
 Buca di Beppo 
 Carrabba's Italian Grill
 Cibo Espresso
 Drago restaurants
 East Side Mario's
 Fazoli's
 Frankie & Benny's
 Italian Tomato
 Kissa Tanto
 Locanda Locatelli
 Manganaro's
 Marea
 Modern Apizza
 Mosconi
 Murano
 Numero 28
 The Old Spaghetti Factory
 Olive Garden
 Osteria del Mondo
 Pasta Pomodoro
 Pastamania
 Patsy's
 Piada Italian Street Food
 La Porchetta
 Prezzo
 Probka Restaurant Group
 Rao's
 The River Café (London)
 Romano's Macaroni Grill
 Saizeriya
 Salumeria Rosi Parmacotto
 San Lorenzo
 Spaghetti Warehouse
 Spaghettim – Italian cuisine restaurant in Petah Tikva, Israel. Used to be a chain with 17 branches.
 Spizzico
 The Station
 Tony Macaroni
 Totti's
 Umberto's Clam House
 Union Street Café, London
 Vapiano
 Veeno
 Veniero's
 Zarra's
 Zizzi – a chain of Italian restaurants found across the United Kingdom which is owned by Gondola Group

United States 

Notable Italian restaurants in the United States include:

 3 Doors Down Café and Lounge, Portland, Oregon
 Acquerello, San Francisco
 Amalfi's Italian Restaurant, Portland, Oregon
 Angelo's Civita Farnese, Providence, Rhode Island
 Ava Gene's, Portland, Oregon
 Bar del Corso, Seattle
 Barbetta, New York City
 Bella's Italian Bakery, Portland, Oregon
 Bertucci's
 BiCE Ristorante, New York City
 Caffe Mingo, Portland, Oregon
 Caffé Vittoria, Boston
 Campisi's Egyptian Restaurant, Dallas
 Caravaggio, New York City
 Carbone
 Carino's Italian
 Cibo, Portland, Oregon
 Defonte's, New York City
 DeLaurenti Food & Wine, Seattle
 Ferrara Bakery and Cafe, New York City
 Filomena Ristorante, Washington, D.C.
 Fiola, Washington, D.C.
 Gargiulo's Italian Restaurant, New York City
 Genoa, Portland, Oregon
 Gilda's Italian Restaurant, Portland, Oregon
 Grassa (restaurant)
 Il Fornaio
 Joe's Pizza, New York City
 Komi, Washington, D.C.
 Lombardi's Pizza, New York City
 Lucy's Cafe
 Lusardi's, New York City
 Maggiano's Little Italy
 Mama Mia Trattoria, Portland, Oregon
 Mucca Osteria, Portland, Oregon
 Nostrana, Portland, Oregon
 Osteria la Spiga, Seattle
 Osteria Mozza, Los Angeles
 Oven and Shaker, Portland, Oregon
 Pastini Pastaria, Oregon
 Pazzo Ristorante, Portland, Oregon
 Piattino, Portland, Oregon
 Piazza Italia, Portland, Oregon
 The Pink Door, Seattle
 Portobello Vegan Trattoria, Portland, Oregon
 Rione XIII, Seattle
 Ristorante Machiavelli, Seattle
 Roman Candle, Portland, Oregon
 Rose Pistola, San Francisco
 Salumi, Seattle
 Sebastiano's, Portland, Oregon
 Spiaggia, Chicago
 Spinasse, Seattle
 Tavolàta, Washington
 Touché Restaurant & Bar, Portland, Oregon
 Vito's, Seattle
 Zefiro, Portland, Oregon

See also

 Italian cuisine
 Italian-American cuisine
 List of Italian chefs
 List of Italian dishes
 Lists of restaurants
 Pizzerias (category)
 Trattoria

External links
 

Restaurants
 
Lists of ethnic restaurants